The City of Geraldton-Greenough was a local government area in the Mid West region of Western Australia,  north of the state capital, Perth on the Indian Ocean.

In existence for exactly four years, it was established on 1 July 2007 through the amalgamation of the former City of Geraldton and Shire of Greenough, and itself amalgamated with the Shire of Mullewa into the City of Greater Geraldton on 1 July 2011.

History
A recommendation was made to the Minister for Local Government by the Local Government Advisory Board in August 2006 to amalgamate the Shire of Greenough with the City of Geraldton.

The Greenough electors successfully petitioned for a referendum to determine whether amalgamation should proceed. This was held on 2 December 2006, and with a participation rate of 28.74%, a majority of 80% voted against the proposal. However, under the Local Government Act 1995 (clause 10 of Schedule 2.1) as the vote did not attract 50% of registered voters, it did not meet the requirements for a valid poll.

The councillors of both local government authorities resigned at the end of April 2007, and elections for the new local government took place in October 2007. The entity was managed by three commissioners in the interim, headed by Jeff Carr, who was the state member for Geraldton from 1974 until 1991.

Throughout 2010 and 2011 negotiations were held between the City of Geraldton-Greenough and the Shire of Mullewa as to whether the two entities should merge. After a long period of negotiations the entities decided to merge. A poll was requested by both communities and was held on 16 April 2011. 83.24% of voters voted against the merger in Mullewa, with 72.39% of voters against the merger in Geraldton-Greenough. However, both polls failed to reach the minimum 50% turnout required to be a valid poll. The two entities will merge on 1 July 2011 to become the City of Greater Geraldton.

Abolishment
The Liberal government announced its intentions to amalgamate local governments around the state in line with reforms undertaken elsewhere in Australia. Ultimately, the plan did not succeed, but a number of local governments commenced negotiations for voluntary mergers. One such group included the City, the Shire of Chapman Valley and the Shire of Mullewa. In February 2010, Chapman Valley decided not to proceed, citing community opposition. In December 2010, the Local Government Advisory Board approved the merger. Polls were held in both municipalities, with 72.61% of voters in Geraldton-Greenough and 83.23% of voters in Mullewa voting against the merger. However, both polls failed to reach the minimum 50% required to be a valid poll, and the City of Greater Geraldton came into being on 1 July 2011.

Wards
The City was divided into six wards, each with two councillors. The Local Government Advisory Board recommended that the mayor be elected from amongst the councillors, as opposed to a directly elected mayor such as the former City of Geraldton.

 Champion Bay Ward – contains Beresford, Spalding and Webberton
 Chapman Ward – contains Bluff Point, Drummond Cove, Glenfield, Sunset Beach and Waggrakine
 Port Ward – contains Geraldton itself, Beachlands and Mahomets Flats
 Tarcoola Ward – contains Mount Tarcoola, Tarcoola Beach and Wandina
 Willcock Ward – contains Karloo, Rangeway, Wonthella and part of Utakarra
 Hills Ward – contains the majority of the City's land area, and includes the suburbs of Strathalbyn and Woorree

Suburbs
 Beachlands
 Beresford
 Bluff Point
 Deepdale
 Geraldton
 Glenfield
 Karloo
 Mahomets Flats
 Moresby
 Mount Tarcoola
 Narngulu
 Rangeway
 Rudds Gully
 Spalding
 Strathalbyn
 Sunset Beach
 Tarcoola Beach
 Utakarra
 Waggrakine
 Wandina
 Webberton
 West End
 Wonthella
 Woorree

Towns
 Cape Burney
 Drummond Cove
 Eradu
 Greenough
 Kojarena
 Minnenooka
 Moonyoonooka
 Walkaway
 Wicherina

Population
The historic populations of the area which formed Geraldton-Greenough were:

See also
 List of mayors of Geraldton

References

Geraldton-Greenough
2011 disestablishments in Australia
Geraldton

fr:Cité de Geraldton-Greenough
nl:City of Geraldton-Greenough